Rafi Bohic (born July 9, 1991) is a French Muay Thai kickboxer who lives in Thailand. He is the current Lumpinee Stadium Welterweight champion.

He is the former WBC Muaythai World Super Lightweight and WMC Junior Welterweight World champion.

Muaythai career
Rafi discovered Muay Thai at 17 years old after a year of training in the French boxing discipline Savate. He moved to Thailand to the Singpatong gym in 2012 inspired by Damien Alamos.

Rafi Bohic won the WBC Muaythai Super Lightweight title with a decision win over Aranchai Kiatpatarphan during the Best Of Siam 8 event.

Bohic won the Lumpini Welterweight belt for the first time in June 2017, with a decision win over Pongsiri P.K.Saenchaimuaythaigym. He was stripped of the title in July, as he was knocked out by Nontakrit Tor Morsi. Bohic would however reclaim the title five months later, after defeating Simanoot Sor Sarinya by decision.

He made his first title defense against Dylan Salvador, whom he beat by a fourth round KO.

Rafi successfully defended the Lumpini Stadium Welterweight title for the second time with a decision win over Petkanthas M-Uden in August 2018, and for the third time with a third round KO win over Thananchai Rachanon in October 2018.

Bohic beat Kongsak Saenchaimuaythaigym by a third round TKO, in November 2018. Rafi defeated Denuhatri by a third round KO in January 2019. He fought a rematch with Chujaroen Dabransarakarm in February 2019, but lost by decision. He was scheduled to fight Avatarn Tor Morsi in March 2019, a fight which he won by decision.

He successfully defended his Lumpini Stadium title for the fourth time with a fourth round knockout of Manachai in April 2019. Manachai was later suspended by Yokkao due to “questionable KO losses” and doubts surrounding “passion for the sport”.

After a successful title defense, Bohic would go on to win his next two fights. He first defeated Chamuaktong Fightermuaythai by a fifth round TKO in the Lumpini Stadium. It was followed up with a decision win over Yodpanomrung Jitmuangnon.

In 2019 Rafi signed with ONE Championship and announced he was aiming to challenge Nong-O Gaiyanghadao for the ONE Muay Thai Bantamweight title. Rafi Bohic was set to make his ONE Championship debut during ONE: Immortal Triumph, but was later replaced by Azize Hlali as Bohic had to pull out due to injury.

Bohic fought Sangmanee Sor Tienpo at the Yod Muay Thai Naikhanomton event in October 2019. His four fight winning streak was snapped, as he lost a decision. Rafi was scheduled to fight Yodlekpet Or. Pitisak at the Ruamponkon Prachin event in November 2019. He lost the fight by decision. He fought a rubber match with Chujaroen Dabransarakarm in December 2019, and lost the fight by decision.

Bohic was scheduled to fight at the AMMA event, against Pakorn PKSaenchaimuaythaigym. He won the fight by decision, and snapped a three fight losing streak.

He is scheduled to fight a rematch with Thananchai Rachanon for the vacant WBC Muaythai World Welterweight title in December 2020. The fight was cancelled as a result of the COVID-19 pandemic.

Bohic was scheduled to face Craig Coakley at RS Challenge on December 19, 2021.

Bohic was scheduled to face Azize Hlali at Nuit des Titans on March 5, 2022. On February 2, 2022, it was announced that Bohic had withdrawn from the fight due to injury.

Titles and accomplishments

Muay thai
 Lumpinee Stadium
 2017 Lumpinee Stadium Welterweight (-147lbs) Champion 
 
 World Boxing Council Muaythai
 2016 WBC World Muay Thai World Super Lightweight (-140lbs) Champion
 
 MAX Muay Thai
 2014 MAX Muay Thai -67kg World Champion
 
 World Muaythai Council
 2013 WMC World -63.5kg Champion

Fight record

|-  style="background:#;"
|  2023-06-15 ||  || align="left" | Antar Kacem || Les Champions du Monde de Kickboxing|| Marrakech, Morocco ||  ||  || 
|-  style="background:#;"
| 2023-04-07 ||  ||align=left| Tapaokaew Singmawynn || ONE Friday Fights 12  || Bangkok, Thailand ||  ||  || 

|-
|- style="background:#cfc"
| 2023-02-11 || Win||align=left| Nonthachai Jitmuangnon || LWC Super Champ, Lumpinee Stadium || Bangkok, Thailand || Decision (Unanimous)|| 5 || 3:00
|- style="background:#fbb"
| 2022-11-05 || Loss||align=left| Sevket Cerkez || Roar Fighting Championship  || London, England || Decision (Unanimous)|| 5 || 3:00
|-
! style=background:white colspan=9 |
|- style="background:#cfc"
| 2021-12-19 || Win ||align=left| Craig Coakley || RS Challenge  || Lyon, France || Decision (Split)|| 5 || 3:00
|- style="background:#cfc;"
| 2021-07-10 ||Win||align=left| Pasquale G Amoroso || Ring Side Gym Show || Dardilly, France || Decision || 5 || 3:00
|- style="background:#cfc;"
| 2020-02-23 ||Win||align=left| Pakorn PKSaenchaimuaythaigym || Authentic Mix Martial Arts || Phuket, Thailand || Decision || 3 || 3:00
|- style="background:#fbb;"
| 2019-12-06 ||Loss||align=left| Chujaroen Dabransarakarm || Lumpinee Stadium || Bangkok, Thailand || Decision || 5 || 3:00
|-  style="background:#fbb;"
| 2019-11-07|| Loss ||align=left| Yodlekpet Or. Pitisak|| Ruamponkon Prachin ||Prachinburi, Thailand|| Decision || 5 || 3:00
|-  style="background:#fbb;"
| 2019-10-05||Loss||align=left| Sangmanee Sor Tienpo || Yod Muay Thai Naikhanomton || Buriram, Thailand || Decision|| 5 || 3:00
|-  style="background:#cfc;"
| 2019-07-26 || Win ||align=left| Yodpanomrung Jitmuangnon ||  || Hatyai, Thailand || Decision || 5 || 3:00
|-  style="background:#cfc;"
| 2019-05-28 || Win ||align=left| Chamuaktong Fightermuaythai || Lumpinee Stadium || Phuket, Thailand || TKO (Low kicks) || 5 ||
|-  style="background:#cfc;"
| 2019-04-30 || Win ||align=left| Manachai || Lumpinee Stadium || Bangkok, Thailand || KO || 4 ||
|-
! style=background:white colspan=9 |
|-  style="background:#cfc;"
| 2019-03-30 || Win ||align=left| Avatar Tor.Morsri || Muaythai Singpatong || Phuket, Thailand || Decision || 5 || 3:00
|-  style="background:#fbb;"
| 2019-02-05 || Loss ||align=left| Chujaroen Dabransarakarm || Lumpinee || Bangkok, Thailand || Decision || 5 || 3:00
|-
|-  style="background:#cfc;"
| 2019-01-05 || Win ||align=left| Denuhatri || Singpatong Saturday || Phuket, Thailand || KO || 3 ||
|-  style="background:#cfc;"
| 2018-11-13 || Win ||align=left| Kongsak Saenchaimuaythaigym || Lumpinee Stadium || Bangkok, Thailand || TKO (Low kicks)|| 3 || 
|-
|-  style="background:#cfc;"
| 2018-10-12 || Win ||align=left| Thananchai Rachanon || All Star Muay-Thai || Aubervilliers, France || KO (Low kicks) || 3 || 
|-
! style=background:white colspan=9 |
|-  style="background:#cfc;"
| 2018-08-28 || Win ||align=left| Petkanthas M-Uden || Lumpinee Stadium || Bangkok, Thailand || Decision || 5 || 3:00
|-
! style=background:white colspan=9 |
|-  style="background:#cfc;"
| 2018-07-29 || Win ||align=left| Taksila Chor. Haphayak || Blue Arena || Bangkok, Thailand || KO (Elbow)|| 4 ||
|-  style="background:#cfc;"
| 2018-06-16 || Win ||align=left| Han Zihao || Topking World Series || Surat Thani, Thailand || Decision  || 5 || 3:00
|-  style="background:#fbb;"
| 2018-05-22 || Loss ||align=left| Pongsiri P.K.Saenchaimuaythaigym || Lumpinee Stadium || Bangkok, Thailand || Decision || 5 || 3:00
|-
! style=background:white colspan=9 |
|-  style="background:#fbb;"
| 2018-04-08 || Loss ||align=left| Bobo Sacko || Duel 3 || Paris, France || Decision || 5 || 3:00
|-  style="background:#cfc;"
| 2018-02-27 || Win ||align=left| Dylan Salvador || Best Of Siam XII || Bangkok, Thailand || KO (Elbow) || 4 || 
|-
! style=background:white colspan=9 |
|-  style="background:#cfc;"
| 2018-02-03 || Win ||align=left| Aekyuzang K Max Muaythai || Saturday Fight Night || Phuket, Thailand || KO || 2 ||
|-  style="background:#cfc;"
| 2017-12-26 || Win ||align=left| Simanoot Sor Sarinya|| Lumpinee Stadium || Bangkok, Thailand || Decision || 5 || 3:00 
|-
! style=background:white colspan=9 |
|-  style="background:#cfc;"
| 2017-11-10 || Win ||align=left| Attachai Tor.Morsi || Lumpinee Stadium || Bangkok, Thailand || Decision || 5 || 3:00
|-  style="background:#fbb;"
| 2017-09-10 || Loss ||align=left| Pongsiri P.K.Saenchaimuaythaigym || Lumpinee Stadium || Bangkok, Thailand || Decision || 5 || 3:00
|-  style="background:#fbb;"
| 2017-07-18 || Loss ||align=left| Nontakrit Tor Morsi. || Lumpinee Stadium || Bangkok, Thailand || KO (Liver kick)|| 3 || 
|-
! style=background:white colspan=9 |
|-  style="background:#cfc;"
| 2017-06-17 || Win ||align=left| Pongsiri P.K.Saenchaimuaythaigym || Lumpinee Stadium || Bangkok, Thailand || Decision || 5 || 3:00
|-
! style=background:white colspan=9 |
|-  style="background:#cfc;"
| 2017-05-12 || Win ||align=left| Audnoi Kaoklaigym || Lumpinee Stadium || Bangkok, Thailand || KO (Middle kick)|| 4 || 3:00
|-  style="background:#fbb;"
| 2017-04-04 || Loss ||align=left| Rambo Pet.Por.Tor.Or || Lumpinee Stadium || Bangkok, Thailand || Decision || 4 || 3:00
|-  style="background:#cfc;"
| 2017-02-24 || Win ||align=left| Srimuangpai Amnatmuaythaigym || Lumpinee Stadium || Bangkok, Thailand || Decision || 5 || 3:00
|-  style="background:#cfc;"
| 2017-01-22 || Win ||align=left| Srimuangpai Amnatmuaythaigym || o.To.Ko || Thailand || Decision || 5 || 3:00
|-  style="background:#cfc;"
| 2016-12-10 || Win ||align=left| Chalamthong SitPanun || Lumpinee Stadium || Thailand || TKO (Low kick) || 2 ||
|-  style="background:#fbb;"
| 2016-10-29 || Loss ||align=left| Chujaroen Dabransarakarm || Best Of Siam IX Lumpinee Stadium || Thailand || TKO || 3 ||
|-  style="background:#fbb;"
| 2016-10-07 || Loss ||align=left| Pongsiri P.K.Saenchaimuaythaigym || Lumpinee Stadium || Bangkok, Thailand || Decision || 5 || 3:00
|-  style="background:#fbb;"
| 2016-09-02 || Loss ||align=left| Pongsiri P.K.Saenchaimuaythaigym || Lumpinee Stadium || Bangkok, Thailand || Decision || 5 || 3:00
|-
! style=background:white colspan=9 |
|-  style="background:#fbb;"
| 2016-08-05 || Loss||align=left| Satanfah Rachanon || Kiatpetch Show || Thailand || Decision || 5 || 3:00
|-  style="background:#cfc;"
| 2016-07-08 || Win ||align=left| Simanut Sor.Sirinya || Lumpinee Stadium || Bangkok, Thailand || Decision || 5 || 3:00
|-  style="background:#cfc;"
| 2016-05-27 || Win ||align=left| Aranchai Kiatpatarphan || Best Of Siam 8 Rajadamnern Stadium || Bangkok, Thailand || Decision || 5 || 3:00
|-
! style=background:white colspan=9 |
|-  style="background:#cfc;"
| 2016-05-03 || Win ||align=left| Senkeng Kiatjaroenchai || Lumpinee Stadium || Bangkok, Thailand || KO (Punches)|| 3 ||
|-  style="background:#fbb;"
| 2016-03-26 || Loss ||align=left| Sibmean Sitchefboontham || Omnoi Stadium || Samut Sakhon Province, Thailand || TKO || 4 || 
|-
! style=background:white colspan=9 |
|-  style="background:#cfc;"
| 2016-02-16 || Loss ||align=left| Faipa Sor.Nalongritt || Fooktiengroup Tournament || Thailand || ||  ||
|-  style="background:#cfc;"
| 2015-12-29 || Win ||align=left| Inseetong Por.Phinaphat || Fooktiengroup Tournament || Thailand || ||  ||
|-  style="background:#cfc;"
| 2015-10-31 || Win ||align=left| Dejteewada Sitikoon || Omnoi Stadium || Samut Sakhon Province, Thailand || KO || 3 ||
|-  style="background:#cfc;"
| 2015-10-03 || Win ||align=left| Nawee Eaglemuaythai || Omnoi Stadium || Samut Sakhon Province, Thailand || KO || 3 ||
|-  style="background:#cfc;"
| 2015-09-05 || Win ||align=left| Jaknalonglek Tor Silatchai || Omnoi Stadium || Samut Sakhon Province, Thailand || Decision || 5 || 3:00
|-  style="background:#cfc;"
| 2015-08-01 || Win ||align=left| Jom Kitti || Rhino Invasion || Kuala Lumpur || Decision || 5 || 3:00
|-  style="background:#cfc;"
| 2015-05-23 || Win ||align=left| Jim Brazzale || Radikal Fight Night 3 || France || Decision || 5 || 3:00
|-  style="background:#cfc;"
| 2015-04-18 || Loss ||align=left| Yannick Reine || Konateam Tournament, Final || France || Decision || 5 || 3:00
|-  style="background:#cfc;"
| 2015-04-18 || Win ||align=left| Anthony Defretin || Konateam Tournament, Semi Final || France || TKO || 2 ||
|-  style="background:#cfc;"
| 2015-04-04 || Win ||align=left| Kong Samui Lukjaoporongtom || Thai Fight || France || Decision || 5 || 3:00
|-  style="background:#cfc;"
| 2015-01-31 || Win ||align=left| Nakornsri EliteFightclub || Muaythai Fury || Phuket, Thailand || KO || 1 ||
|-  style="background:#cfc;"
| 2015-01-31 || Win ||align=left| Kompetch Lukjaoma || Muaythai Fury || Phuket, Thailand || KO || 1 ||
|-  style="background:#fbb;"
| 2014-12-29 || Loss ||align=left| Sarikadong || Petchbuncha Samui Stadium || Thailand || Decision  || 5 || 3:00
|-  style="background:#fbb;"
| 2014-12-07 || Loss ||align=left| Jingreedtong Seatranferry || Max Muay Thai Final Chapter || Thailand || Decision || 5 || 3:00
|-  style="background:#cfc;"
| 2014-11-15 || Win ||align=left| Phiphatpong || Patong Boxing Stadium || Thailand || TKO || 4 ||
|-  style="background:#cfc;"
| 2014-10-18 || Win ||align=left| Plabsek Sitkruseang || Lumpinee Stadium || Thailand || Decision  || 5 || 3:00
|-  style="background:#cfc;"
| 2014-09-19 || Win ||align=left| Fahmankol SItparnsak || Eminentair Fight || Thailand || Decision  || 5 || 3:00
|-  style="background:#cfc;"
| 2014-08-03 || Win ||align=left| Changpuek MUaythaiacademy || Max Muay Thai|| Pattaya, Thailand || Decision  || 5 || 3:00
|-  style="background:#fbb;"
| 2014-06-07 || Loss ||align=left| Jimmy Vienot || Gala du Phenix Muaythai 6 || France || Decision  || 5 || 3:00
|-  style="background:#cfc;"
| 2014-03-15 || Win ||align=left| Wanassai || Suk Singpatong + Sitnumnoi || Phuket, Thailand || KO || 1 ||
|-  style="background:#cfc;"
| 2014-02-16 || Win ||align=left| Guo Dongwang || Max Muay Thai China || Zhengzhou, China || Decision || 3 || 3:00
|-
! style=background:white colspan=9 |
|-  style="background:#cfc;"
| 2014-02-16 || Win ||align=left| Sangfa Silalai  || Max Muay Thai China || Zhengzhou, China || Decision || 3 || 3:00
|-  style="background:#cfc;"
| 2014-01-18 || Win ||align=left| Daowgpragai Sorsommai || Patong Boxing Stadium || Phuket, Thailand || KO || 1 ||
|-  style="background:#cfc;"
| 2014-01-04 || Win ||align=left| Kangkenlek SBP Car Network || Patong Boxing Stadium || Phuket, Thailand || KO (Left hook to the body) || 2 ||
|-  style="background:#cfc;"
| 2013-12-05 || Win ||align=left| Rungrath Naratrikul || King's Birthday || Bangkok, Thailand || Decision || 5 || 3:00
|-  style="background:#cfc;"
| 2013-11-16 || Win ||align=left| Seksan Tiger Muaythai || Patong Boxing Stadium || Phuket, Thailand || TKO (Referee Stoppage)|| 4 ||
|-  style="background:#c5d2ea;"
| 2013-10-26 || Draw ||align=left| Rungrath Naratrikul || Patong Boxing Stadium || Phuket, Thailand || Decision || 5 || 3:00
|-  style="background:#fbb;"
| 2013-09-13 || Loss ||align=left| Jacksiam SinbiMuaythai || Friday Night, Bangla Boxing Stadium || Phuket, Thailand || Decision || 5 || 3:00
|-  style="background:#cfc;"
| 2013-07-26 || Win ||align=left| Vung Noy || Khmer Fighter || Cambodia || Decision || 5 || 3:00
|-  style="background:#fbb;"
| 2013-06-28 || Loss ||align=left| Saenchai || Muay Thai Warriors: Dabble in Chiang Mai || Chiang Mai, Thailand || Decision (unanimous) || 5 || 3:00
|-  style="background:#cfc;"
| 2013-04-28 || Win ||align=left| Anvar Boynazarov || 9th Anniversary Bangla Boxing Stadium || Phuket, Thailand || TKO (Doctor Stoppage) || 3 || 
|-
! style=background:white colspan=9 |
|-  style="background:#fbb;"
| 2013-04-05 || Loss ||align=left| Boo Sasiprapa || Muay Thai Warriors || Pattaya, Thailand || Decision || 5 || 3:00
|-  style="background:#cfc;"
| 2013-03-13 || Win ||align=left| Sangsakda Phuket Topteam || King Of Muay Thai || Phuket, Thailand || TKO || 4 ||
|-  style="background:#cfc;"
| 2012-12-26 || Win ||align=left| Taharnaek PatongBoxingGym || King Fight Of The Year || Phuket, Thailand || Decision || 5 || 3:00
|-  style="background:#cfc;"
| 2012-12-26 || Win ||align=left| Victor Manop Gym || King Fight Of The Year || Phuket, Thailand || Decision || 5 || 3:00
|-  style="background:#cfc;"
| 2012-12-26 || Win ||align=left| Chalamkraw RawaiMuaythai || King Fight Of The Year || Phuket, Thailand || Decision || 5 || 3:00
|-  style="background:#cfc;"
| 2012-12-08 || Win ||align=left| DECGA || Lumpinee Stadium || Bangkok, Thailand || KO (Knees)|| 5 ||
|-  style="background:#cfc;"
| 2012-11-14 || Win ||align=left| Anvar Boynazarov || Bangla Stadium || Thailand || KO (Straight to the body)|| 2 ||
|-  style="background:#cfc;"
| 2012-11-02 || Win ||align=left| Popeye JavienMuaythai || Bangla Stadium || Thailand || Decision || 5 || 3:00
|-  style="background:#cfc;"
| 2012-10-07 || Win ||align=left| Sany Bangtao Muaythai || Sunday Championship Night, Bangla Boxing Stadium || Thailand || Decision || 5 || 3:00
|-  style="background:#cfc;"
| 2012-09-09 || Win ||align=left| Ramil SinbiMuayThai || Sunday Championship Night, Bangla Boxing Stadium || Thailand || Decision || 5 || 3:00
|-
| colspan=9 | Legend:

See also
List of male kickboxers

References

Living people
French male kickboxers
Welterweight kickboxers
French Muay Thai practitioners
French expatriate sportspeople in Thailand
1991 births
Sportspeople from Le Havre
ONE Championship kickboxers